Cannabis refugee (or marijuana refugee) is a term, primarily used in the United States and Canada, referring to people who have moved from one location to another due to cannabis prohibition laws, motivated either by a desire to have legal access to cannabis to treat medical conditions for themselves or their family, or to legally consume cannabis for any other reason. A related term is trimmigrant, which refers to migrant workers who travel to the Emerald Triangle during the summer to work on the seasonal marijuana harvest.

References

External links

http://www.military.com/daily-news/2015/12/09/marijuana-refugees-wounded-veterans-willing-move-medicinal-pot.html
http://wnpr.org/post/connecticut-medical-marijuana-refugees-will-stay-maine
https://www.nbcnews.com/business/consumer/marijuana-refugees-looking-new-homes-pot-legal-states-n22781
https://www.democracynow.org/2014/5/9/marijuana_refugees_virginia_family_moves_to
http://www.derryjournal.com/news/billy-caldwell-s-big-brother-kyle-is-bringing-cannabis-run-to-derry-1-7714964 (Ireland)
http://missoulian.com/lifestyles/health-med-fit/marijuana-refugees-families-relocating-to-colorado-so-kids-can-use/article_0e0670aa-dabb-11e3-8c2d-0019bb2963f4.html
http://www.csmonitor.com/USA/Society/2015/0327/How-marijuana-refugees-brought-legal-cannabis-to-Georgia-video
http://www.dopemagazine.com/love-cannabis-will-travel/
http://www.nytimes.com/2012/04/03/world/europe/dutch-law-would-stop-sale-of-marijuana-to-tourists.html (2012 attestation of the term)

Cannabis prohibition
Cannabis and health
Refugees by type